Archiinocellia is an extinct genus of snakefly in the family Raphidiidae known from Eocene fossils found in western North America. The genus contains two species, the older Archiinocellia oligoneura  and the younger Archiinocellia protomaculata.  The type species is of Ypresian age and from the Horsefly Beds of British Columbia, while the younger species from the Lutetian Green River Formation in Colorado.  Archiinocellia protomaculata was first described as Agulla protomaculata, and later moved to Archiinocellia.

Distribution
Archiinocellia oligoneura is known from a single specimen collected by Canadian geologist and paleontologist Lawrence M. Lambe during fieldwork in central British Columbia. The fossil was collected on July 21, 1906, from fossil bearing rocks near the Horsefly mine in Horsefly, British Columbia.

The Archiinocellia protomaculata fossils were recovered from the Green River Formations Parachute Member which outcrops in the Piceance Creek Basin and Uinta Basin of Garfield County, northwestern Colorado.

Age 
The age of the Horsefly sites was considered Oligocene for many years and Archiinocellia is still listed as an Oligocene genus in many modern works. However, the site has been re-dated to the Early Eocene and is part of the Okanagan Highlands fossil localities, which stretch from Driftwood Canyon Provincial Park in Smithers, B.C. south to Republic, Washington.

The Parachute Member of the Green River Formation is younger than the Horsefly Beds, with a Middle Eocene age, placing it in the Lutetian stage.

History and Classification
The A. oligoneura holotype specimen was first studied and described by the prolific paleoentomologist Anton Handlirsch (1910). The genus was named from archi referring to the primitive appearance of the wing characters and Inocellia, the type genus for Inocelliidae, the family the genus was placed in originally.  The species name is a combination of oligo in reference to Oligocene, the age the location of the fossil was thought to be, and "neura".

After examining the holotype, Frank Carpenter (1936) noted that the fossil was poorly preserved and the placement of the wings presented difficulties. While accepting Handlirschs drawings of the wings, Carpenter states the damage to the wings prevents any determination of genus placement lower than Raphidioptera incertae sedis. This placement was followed by Michael Engel (2002) in his listing of Raphidioptera fossil genera, where he placed the genus no lower than the suborder Raphidiomorpha.  Engel also noted the genus to be the only snakefly fossil genus from British Columbia and one of only two from Canada at that time.

Archiinocellia protomaculata is known from a series of eighteen fossils, the holotype, three paratype females, ten male paratypes, and three paratypes of indeterminate sex.  The holotype, number "USNM 31487", is a single female specimen consisting of part and counterpart fossils. The type series plus an additional male specimen tentatively identified as also A. protomaculata are preserved in the Department of Paleobiology collections for the Smithsonians National Museum of Natural History. A. protomaculata was first studied by Michael S. Engel with his 2009 type description being published in the journal Transactions of the Kansas Academy of Science.  Engel coined the specific epithet protomaculata as a combination of the Latin word "protos" meaning "first" and "macula" meaning "mark".  At least one other specimen is known and was figured in a 1995 publication by Dayvault et al, but that specimen is thought to still be in the private collection of William Hawes.  At the time of the species description, A. protomaculata was the only member of the order Raphidioptera to be described from the Green River Formation.

The Horsefly Beds and Green river Formation fossils were reexamined and redescribed by Archibald and Makarkin (2021), who identified A. protomaculata as a member of Archiinocellia rather than of Agulla.  They also refined the genus placement, moving it from Raphidiodea  incertae sedis to a member of Raphidiidae.

Description

Archiinocellia oligoneura
The holotype consists of a superimposed partial pair of wings, one forewing and one hindwing, thus not allowing for gender identification and body description. The bases and several small areas of the apex and pterostigmal region are missing. Though difficult to distinguish from one another, the forewing and hindwing vein structures show several distinct traits that set the genus apart from other raphidiopteran genera. Anton Handlirsch notes the damage to the pterostigma prevents determining if any cross veining is present. In a basal position from the stigma is a cross vein which does not correspond to the cross vein in the same region of modern Raphidia species.

Archiinocellia protomaculata
Specimens of A. protomaculata average  in length not including the ovipositor in the females. Overall the species was a dark brown to brown coloration, with the legs shading from light brown to a yellow tone. The head is dark brown with extensive yellow coloration including yellow stripes along the sides and to the rear of the eyes, and a central stripe of yellow running down the center of the head behind the eyes. The vein structure of the fore-wing and notably the length and placement of the M vein in the hind-wing indicated at the time, the species to be a member of the genus Agulla.

References

Raphidioptera
Ypresian insects
Lutetian insects
Eocene insects of North America
Fossil taxa described in 1910
Fossil taxa described in 2011
Extinct animals of Canada
Taxa named by Michael S. Engel
Natural history of Colorado
Prehistoric insect genera